Ranbir Kapoor is an Indian actor who appears in Hindi films. He worked as an assistant director on the films Aa Ab Laut Chalen (1999) and Black (2005), before making his acting debut opposite Sonam Kapoor in Sanjay Leela Bhansali's romantic drama Saawariya (2007). It earned Kapoor the Filmfare Award for Best Male Debut. He established himself in 2009 with leading roles in three filmsthe coming-of-age drama Wake Up Sid, the comedy Ajab Prem Ki Ghazab Kahani and the drama Rocket Singh: Salesman of the Year. He won the Filmfare Critics Award for Best Actor for his combined work in these three films. In 2010, Kapoor played a character based on Arjuna and Michael Corleone in the commercially successful political thriller Raajneeti.

From 2011 to 2013, Kapoor's releases were among the highest-grossing Hindi films of their respective years. In Imtiaz Ali's musical Rockstar (2011), he played an aspiring singer, and in Anurag Basu's comedy-drama Barfi! (2012), he starred as a joyful deaf and mute man. His performance in both films was critically acclaimed and he earned two consecutive Best Actor awards at Filmfare and the former also earned him a Filmfare Critics Award for Best Actor.

This success was followed by several commercial failures, including the period drama Bombay Velvet (2015), the romance Tamasha (2015), and the comic mystery Jagga Jasoos (2017); the latter also marked Kapoor's first production venture. His sole commercial success in this period came with Ae Dil Hai Mushkil (2016), in which he starred as a musician involved in a one-sided love affair. It earned him another Filmfare Award for Best Actor. Following a four-year absence from the screen, Kapoor returned in 2022 with the period film Shamshera and the fantasy film Brahmāstra: Part One – Shiva. The latter ranks among the most expensive Indian films and the highest-grossing Hindi films.

Films

All films are in Hindi unless otherwise noted.

Television

Music videos

See also
List of awards and nominations received by Ranbir Kapoor

Notes

References

External links
 
 Ranbir Kapoor on Bollywood Hungama

Indian filmographies
Male actor filmographies